Vigraharaja may refer to any of the following Indian kings from the Shakambhari Chahamana dynasty:

 Vigraharaja I (r. r. c. 734-759 CE)
 Vigraharaja II (r. c. 971-998 CE)
 Vigraharaja III (r. c. 1070-1090 CE)
 Vigraharaja IV (r. c. 1150-1164 CE)